Sir Neil Pritchard, KCMG (14 January 1911 – 10 October 2010) was a British diplomat. He was British High Commissioner to Tanganyika from 1961 to 1963 and British Ambassador to Thailand from 1967 to 1970.

References 

1911 births
2010 deaths
Ambassadors of the United Kingdom to Thailand